Lara Heinz (born 27 May 1981 in Luxembourg City) is a retired Luxembourgian swimmer, who specialized in sprint freestyle events. She is a two-time national record holder for both the long and short course freestyle (50 and 100 m).

Heinz made her Olympic debut, as a 19-year-old, at the 2000 Summer Olympics in Sydney, competing in both 50 and 100-metre freestyle. First, Heinz touched out Thailand's Pilin Tachakittiranan to take the fourth spot in heat three of the  women's 100 m freestyle by 0.14 of a second in 58.55. In her second event, 50 m freestyle, Heinz snared the fifth spot by two hundredths of a second ahead of Fiji's Caroline Pickering in 26.55, but fell short to advance to the semifinals, placing thirty-fourth overall on the morning prelims. Heinz also served as Luxembourg's flag bearer in the opening ceremony. 

Four years later, Heinz qualified for her second Luxembourgian team, as a 23-year-old, at the 2004 Summer Olympics in Athens. She attained B-standard entry times of 26.41 (50 m freestyle) and 57.14 (100 m freestyle) from the European Long Course Meet in Luxembourg. In the 100 m freestyle, Heinz edged out Hungary's Ágnes Mutina to take the fifth spot in heat three and thirty-sixth overall by 0.70 of a second, with a time of 57.40. In the 50 m freestyle, Heinz touched out Iceland's Ragnheiður Ragnarsdóttir to a fifth-heat triumph by a single hundredth margin (0.01), breaking a Luxembourgian record of 26.35 seconds. Her storming victory was not insufficiently enough to put her through the semifinals, as Heinz placed thirtieth out of 75 swimmers in the morning preliminaries.

References

1981 births
Living people
Luxembourgian female swimmers
Olympic swimmers of Luxembourg
Swimmers at the 2000 Summer Olympics
Swimmers at the 2004 Summer Olympics
Luxembourgian female freestyle swimmers
Sportspeople from Luxembourg City